is a railway station in Sunagawa, Hokkaidō, Japan.

Lines
Hokkaido Railway Company
Hakodate Main Line Station A19

Adjacent stations

Railway stations in Hokkaido Prefecture
Railway stations in Japan opened in 1947